Sir John Lauder of Fountainhall, 2nd Baronet, Lord Fountainhall (baptised 2 August 1646 – 20 September 1722) was one of Scotland's leading jurists who remains to this day an oft consulted authority. He was knighted in 1680 and matriculated his Arms with the Lyon Court on 15 June 1699.

He gives his name to Fountainhall Close on the Royal Mile in Edinburgh, it being the location of his Edinburgh townhouse.

Life
Lauder was born in Edinburgh, the eldest son, by his second marriage, of Sir John Lauder, 1st Baronet, whom he succeeded after much acrimony. He was educated at the High School and the University of Edinburgh graduating, with an M.A., on 18 July 1664. He then went to the Continent, partly with the view of studying law there. After some travels, he lived at Poitiers from 28 July 1665 until 24 April 1666, following which he proceeded to Paris, Brussels, Antwerp, and Leyden, Holland, where he matriculated at Leiden University on 27 September 1666.

Lord Fountainhall was admitted as an Advocate on 5 June 1668, and on 10 October 1681 infamously sentenced five men to death for witchcraft: Garnock, Foreman, Russel, Ferrie and Stewart. The five were executed at the Gallow Lee on Leith Walk and their bodies interred there and their heads placed on pikes at Cowgate Port. The bodies were exhumed by friends and reinterred in the West Kirk (St Cuthberts). The heads were buried in a box in a garden at Lauriston. They were removed from the garden in 1726 by the then owner Mr Shaw. They were then placed together in one coffin and interred in the north-east corner of Greyfriars Kirkyard next to the Martyrs Monument.

He was counsel for the Earl of Argyll at his trial, 12 & 13 December 1681, and was also one of the advocates chosen by the Duchess of Monmouth to defend her interests during her husband's trial on 15 February 1686. He was called to the Bench on 1 November 1689 as a Lord Ordinary in the Court of Session with the title Lord Fountainhall. He was appointed on 27 January 1690 a Lord of Justiciary, which he resigned after the Union of parliaments, which he had opposed.

He lived in buildings on the Lawnmarket, the upper part of the Royal Mile. These were later replaced by the James Court buildings.

In 1692 he was offered the post of Lord Advocate but declined because the condition was attached that he should not prosecute the persons implicated in the Glencoe Massacre. Sir George Mackenzie, who had been Lord Advocate under King Charles II, also refused to concur in this partial application of the penal laws, and his refusal (unlike Fountainhall's) led to his temporary disgrace.

Sir John was a Justice of the Peace for Haddingtonshire in 1683 and a Burgess of Edinburgh (2 November 1687). He was the Commissioner for Haddingtonshire in Parliament (1685–86, 1690–1707), and spoke several times against the Union.

Lord Fountainhall left a large collection of legal opinions and papers, including some that record Court of Session proceedings from 1678 to 1712, which also note the transactions of the Privy Council of Scotland, and those of the Courts of Justiciary and Exchequer, works compiled with anecdotes of the times and much characteristic ingenuity of observation, to which professional lawyers still turn today.

Lord Fountainhall died at Edinburgh and was interred in the Lauder vault within Greyfriars Kirk. His Testament dated 2 December 1706 was not Proved until more than sixteen years later. He was succeeded in the baronetcy by his son Sir John Lauder, 3rd Baronet.

Family

He married twice:
21 January 1669, at the Tron Kirk, Edinburgh, Janet (1652–1686), daughter of Sir Andrew Ramsay, Lord Abbotshall, 1st Baronet, Lord Provost of Edinburgh and Senator of the College of Justice, (d. 1688), by his wife Janet née Craw. They had six sons (of whom Andrew Lauder, in Edinburgh, and David Lauder of Huntlywood, Berwickshire, were Advocates) and four daughters.
26 March 1687, at Edinburgh, Marion, daughter of the Reverend John Anderson, of Balram, Minister of Dysart. They had three sons and three daughters.

His great-grandson was Gilbert Innes of Stow.

References

Citations

Sources

 Historical Notices of Scotish Affairs; selected from the manuscripts of Sir John Lauder of Fountainhall, Bart., edited by David Laing, 1848.
 Collectanea Genealogica, by Foster, London, 1882, 'Members of Parliament - Scotland'.

 , notably Appendix XIII Holograph Notes by Sir John Lauder - his Legal memorandum on the 1688 Baronetcy Patent and the 1690 Libel Case against his stepmother. Appendix XIV contains his further Holograph Notes on his ancestry.
 Journals of Sir John Lauder, Lord Fountainhall, 1665–1676, edited by Donald Crawford, Scottish History Society publication, Edinburgh, 1900.
 The Complete Baronetage, by G. E. Cokayne, Exeter, 1904, vol. IV, p. 361.

 
 The Faculty of Advocates in Scotland 1523–1943, edited by Sir Francis J. Grant, K.C.V.O.,LL.D.,W.S., Edinburgh, 1944, p. 120–1. Sir John became a member 5 June 1668, and his sons Andrew, 16 January 1703, and David, 27 February 1707.

External links
 
 

1646 births
1722 deaths
Scottish knights
Lauder
Fountainhall
Lawyers from Edinburgh
Scottish essayists
Alumni of the University of Edinburgh
Leiden University alumni
Scottish legal writers
Members of the Faculty of Advocates
17th-century Scottish people
17th-century Scottish politicians
17th-century Scottish writers
Burgesses in Scotland
Shire Commissioners to the Parliament of Scotland
Members of the Parliament of Scotland 1685–1686
Members of the Parliament of Scotland 1689–1702
Members of the Parliament of Scotland 1702–1707
Politicians from Edinburgh